Sui generis is a Latin phrase that means "of its/their own kind", "in a class by itself", therefore "unique".

A number of disciplines use the term to refer to unique entities. These include:
 Biology, for species that do not fit into a genus that includes other species
 Creative arts, for artistic works that go beyond conventional genre boundaries
 Law, when a special and unique interpretation of a case or authority is necessary
 Intellectual property rights, for types of works not falling under general copyright law but protected through separate statutes
 Philosophy, to indicate an idea, an entity, or a reality that cannot be reduced to a lower concept or included in a higher concept

Biology

In the taxonomical structure "genus → species", a species is described as sui generis if its genus was created to classify it (i.e. its uniqueness at the time of classification merited the creation of a new genus, the sole member of which was initially the sui generis species). A species that is the sole extant member of its genus (e.g. the genus Homo) is not necessarily sui generis; extinctions have eliminated other congeneric species.

Creative arts
A book, movie, television series, or other artistic creation is called sui generis when it does not fit into standard genre boundaries. Movie critic Richard Schickel identifies Joe Versus the Volcano as a sui generis movie. Film critic Michael Brooke used the term to describe Fantastic Planet, a 1973 Franco-Czech sci-fi animated film directed by René Laloux.

Law
In law, it is a term of art used to identify a legal classification that exists independently of other categorizations, either because of its singularity or due to the specific creation of an entitlement or obligation. For example, a court's contempt powers arise sui generis and not from statute or rule. The New York Court of Appeals has used the term in describing cooperative apartment corporations, mostly because this form of housing is considered real property for some purposes and personal property for other purposes.

When citing cases and other authorities, lawyers and judges may refer to "a sui generis case", or "a sui generis authority", meaning it is a special one confined to its own facts, and therefore may not be of broader application.

Intellectual property law
Generally speaking, protection for intellectual property extends to intellectual creations in order to incentivize innovation, and depends upon the nature of the work and its characteristics. The main types of intellectual property law are: copyright, which protects creative works; patent, which protects invention; trade secret, which protects information not generally known or readily ascertainable that is valuable to the secret holder; and trademark, which protects branding and other exclusive properties of products and services. Any matter that meets these criteria can be protected.

However, sui generis statutes exist in many countries that extend intellectual property protection to matter that does not meet characteristic definitions: integrated circuit layouts, ship hull designs, fashion designs in France, databases, or plant varieties require sui generis statutes because of their unique characteristics. The United States, Japan, Australia and many EU countries protect the topography of semiconductor chips and integrated circuits under sui generis laws, which borrow some aspects from patent or copyright law. In the U.S. this sui generis law is known as the Semiconductor Chip Protection Act of 1984.

Statutory law

In statutory interpretation, it refers to the problem of giving meaning to groups of words where one of the words is ambiguous or inherently unclear.

For example, in road traffic law, a statute may require consideration of large vehicles separately from other vehicles.  The word large is ambiguous per se, but may be considered heavy.  Thus the relevant legislation (in Australian law) contains a section called Terms used or Definitions that itemises all words considered ambiguous, and confers specific interpretations consistent with natural language.  So, this list tells us that heavy vehicle means a vehicle with a GVM over 4.5 tons, and GVM means gross vehicle mass, the maximum loaded mass of the vehicle. Further explanations cover various contingencies. Thus, large is equivalent to heavy and is (for this unique case) clearly defined sui generis.

Town planning law
In United Kingdom town planning law, in particular relating to the Town and Country Planning (Use Classes) Order 1987, many common types of land use are categorised into specific "use classes". Change of use of land within a use class does not require planning permission; however, changing between use classes might require planning permission, and permission is always required if the new use is sui generis.

Examples of sui generis uses include embassies, theatres, amusement arcades, laundrettes, taxi or vehicle hire businesses, petrol filling stations, scrapyards, nightclubs, motor car showrooms, retail warehouses, clubs and hostels.

As of 1 September 2020 following the Town and Country Planning (Use Classes) (Amendment) (England) Regulations 2020, the following uses were added as sui generis:

 public houses, wine bars, or drinking establishments (previously Class A4)
 drinking establishments with expanded food provision (previously Class A4)
 hot food takeaways (previously Class A5)
 venues for live music performance
 cinemas (previously Class D2(a))
 concert halls (previously D2(b))
 bingo halls (previously D2(c))
 dance halls (previously D2(d))

The grant of private hire vehicle (taxicab) operators licences by local authorities frequently has a condition attached that the appropriate sui generis change of use planning permission is granted to those premises to ensure those businesses cannot trade lawfully without the appropriate planning consents.

Philosophy
Analytic philosophy often uses the expression to indicate an idea, an entity, or a reality that cannot be reduced to a lower concept or included in a higher concept. G.E Moore, for example, refuted ethical naturalism in theories like utilitarianism on the basis that the sui generis concept of good cannot be reduced to a lower concept like pleasure (as seen in the open question argument).

Politics and society

In political philosophy, the unparalleled development of the European Union as compared with other international organizations has led to its designation as a sui generis geopolitical entity. The legal nature of the EU is widely debated because its mixture of intergovernmental and supranational elements causes it to share characteristics with both confederal and federal entities. It is generally considered more than a confederation but less than a federation, thus being appropriately classified as an instance of neither political form. Compared to other international organizations, the EU is often considered "sui generis" because its legal system comprehensively rejects any use of retaliatory sanctions by one member state against another.

A similar case that led to the use of the label sui generis is the relationship of New Caledonia relative to France, because the legal status of New Caledonia can aptly be said to lie somewhere between a French overseas collectivity and a sovereign nation. Although other examples of such status for other dependent or disputed territories may exist, this arrangement is unique within the French realm.

The legal status of the Holy See has also been described as a sui generis entity possessing an international personality. The Sovereign Military Order of Malta has likewise been described as a "sui generis primary subject of public international law". Another entity widely considered to have sui generis international legal personality is the International Committee of the Red Cross.

In local government, a sui generis entity is one that does not fit with the general scheme of local governance of a country. For example in England, the City of London and the Isles of Scilly are the two sui generis localities, as their forms of local government are both (for historical or geographical reasons) very different from those of elsewhere in the country. 
In a press conference during which reporters were trying to analyse his political personality,  Huey Long said, "...say that I am sui generus, and let it go at that."

The Joint Council of Municipalities in Croatia is a sui generis council of municipalities in the east of the country that was formed after the Erdut Agreement and UNTAES mission aimed at protection of the rights of the ethnic Serb community in the region and is, as such, unique form of local cooperation and minority self-government in Croatia.

Sociology 
In sociology, methodological holists argue that social phenomena exist in their own right (sui generis) and are not reducible to the actions of individuals. For example, Emile Durkheim argued that the suicide rate was a social phenomenon sui generis (existing over and above the actions of individuals) In a social constructionist perspective, "sui generis is what has been externalized, then internalized in the overall public and becomes a part of society that simply exists in its construct. It is not something that is not thought to have been created, because it is embedded in everyone's way of thinking and being. Instances include the idea of love, or going to school, or clothing belonging to a specific gender. These examples are sui generis'' for they simply exist in society and are widely accepted without thoughts of where they come from or how they were created.

See also
 
 
 List of Latin phrases

References

Latin legal terminology
Exceptionalism